The Kiran Kumar Reddy ministery was formed on 25 November 2010 headed by N. Kiran Kumar Reddy after the resignation of the incumbent Chief Minister Konijeti Rosaiah. This is the last council of ministrers of the United Andhra Pradesh.

Council of Ministers

The following is a list of the ministers in Andhra Pradesh.

Former Ministers
The Following Ministers Has Resigned Due To Various Reasons

References

Andhra Pradesh ministries
Indian National Congress state ministries
2010 in Indian politics
2010 establishments in Andhra Pradesh
Cabinets established in 2010
Cabinets disestablished in 2014
2014 disestablishments in India